Cosmic Slop is a 1994 American anthology television film executive produced by Reginald and Warrington Hudlin. The film is hosted by musician and Parliament-Funkadelic frontman George Clinton, and derives its title from the 1973 album and song of the same name by Clinton and Funkadelic.

Cosmic Slop features three short stories, directed by the Hudlin brothers and Kevin Rodney Sullivan. The first and third segments are based on the short stories "The Space Traders" by Derrick Bell and "Tang" by Chester Himes, respectively. The film's ensemble cast includes Robert Guillaume, Jason Bernard, Edward Edwards, Larry Anderson, Nicholas Turturro, Richard Herd, Paula Jai Parker, and Chi McBride.

Cast

"Space Traders"

"The First Commandment"

"Tang"
 Paula Jai Parker as Tang
 Chi McBride as T-Bone
 Reno Wilson as The Messenger

Release
Cosmic Slop premiered on HBO at 10:00 pm Eastern Standard Time on November 8, 1994 (03:00 UTC, November 9).

Reception
Ken Parish Perkins of the Chicago Tribune likened Cosmic Slop to "a multicultural Twilight Zone filled with political and racial angst," calling it "offbeat, humorous and disturbingly effective." Perkins concluded that "the Hudlin brothers have created a politically charged anthology that doesn't flinch or apologize for its views. This could ultimately prove unsettling, even to the usually risk-taking executives at HBO." Mike Duffy of the Detroit Free Press wrote that Cosmic Slop "suffers erratic, hit-and-miss moments," save for the "Tang" segment; Duffy wrote that "Tang" "echoes the provocative intelligence of the original Twilight Zone", and praised the performances of Baker and McBride.

References

External links
 

1994 films
1994 television films
1990s science fiction films
American anthology films
1990s English-language films
Films about extraterrestrial life
Films based on short fiction
HBO Films films